Myanmar English (also called Burmese English) is the register of the English language used in Myanmar (Burma), spoken as first or second language by an estimated 2.4 million people, about 5% of the population (1997). The English language was initially introduced to the country during the British colonial period, spanning from 1824 until independence in 1948.

History

The British Empire annexed modern-day Myanmar in three stages over a six-decade span (1824–1885). It administered Myanmar as a province of British India until 1937, and as a separate colony until 1948. During the British colonial period, English was the medium of instruction in higher education, although it did not replace Burmese as the vernacular. English was the medium of instruction in universities and two types of secondary schools: English schools and Anglo-Vernacular schools (where English was taught as a second language). Burmese English resembles Indian English to a degree because of historical ties to India during British colonization.

On 1 June 1950, a new education policy was implemented to replace Burmese as the medium of instruction at all state schools, although universities, which continued to use English as the medium of instruction, were unaffected. English became taught as a second language beginning in the Fifth Standard. Until 1965, English was the language of instruction at Burmese universities. 

In 1965, Burmese replaced English as the medium of instruction at the university level, with the passing of the New University Education Law the previous year. English language education was reintroduced in 1982. Currently, English is taught from Standard 0 (kindergarten), as a second language. Since 1991, in the 9th and 10th Standards, English and Burmese have both been used as the medium of instruction, particularly in science and math subjects, which use English language textbooks. Because of this, many Burmese are better able to communicate in written English than in spoken English, due to emphasis placed on writing and reading.

Characteristics

Orthography 

The preferred system of spelling is based on that of the British, although American English spellings have become increasingly popular. Because Adoniram Judson, an American, created the first Burmese-English dictionary, many American English spellings are common (e.g. color, check, encyclopedia). The ⟨-ize⟩ spelling is more commonly used than the ⟨-ise⟩ spelling.

Vocabulary 
Burmese English is often characterised by its unaspirated consonants, similar to Indian English. It also borrows words from standard English and uses them in a slightly different context. For instance, "pavement" (British English) or "sidewalk" (US English) is commonly called "platform" in Burmese English. "Stage show" is also preferred over "concert."

For units of measurement Burmese English use both those of the Imperial System and those of the International System of Units interchangeably, but the values correspond to the SI system. Burmese English continues to use Indian numerical units such as lakh and crore.

The Burmese language, especially the colloquial form, has borrowed daily vocabulary from English, especially as portmanteaus with native Burmese vocabulary. For instance, the Burmese word for 'ball' is bawlon, while the Burmese word for bus is bat-sa-ka.

Honorifics 

Burmese names represented in English often include various honorifics, most commonly "U", "Daw", and "Sayadaw". For older Burmese who only have one or two syllables in their names these honorifics may be an integral part of the name.

Pronunciation
In Burmese English, the k, p, and t consonants are unaspirated (pronounced ), as a general rule, as in Indian English. The following are commonly seen pronunciation differences between Standard English and Burmese English:

In addition, many words retain British pronunciation, such as vitamin . Burmese English is non-rhotic.

References 

Dialects of English
Languages of Myanmar